Guanentá Province is a province in Santander Department, Colombia. The province was named after the Amerindian Chief Guanentá, leader of the Guanes, who were the original inhabitants of the region.

Geography 

The municipalities forming the province are:

Aratoca 

A small town located within the Chicamocha Canyon. Its main attraction, other than fantastic views, is the colonial church, Nuestra Señora de las Nieves. The entire façade was built with locally sourced Guane stones. With its interior containing one large nave and four chapels. You will also discover a wonderful bell tower singing daily

Barichara 

Is the jewel in the crown of the province of Guanentá. Its unspoiled colonial architecture, stone streets, and white houses that have preserved the old construction materials such as Tapia (compacted earth) and bahareque, make it one of the most beautiful towns in Colombia. Is very touristic place, so it makes a vibrant activity in its streets and squares, with boutique hotels, restaurants, and cafes of international stature.

Charalá 

Called the Cradle of Freedom, due to the great support it provided in the Commune Revolution, Charalá has several places of interest, such as the Virolín natural park, the Tigre cave, the chalice-shaped waterfall of Quebrada Tinagá, the church of Nuestra Señora de Monguí, the House of Culture and the Archaeological Museum.

Curití 

To one side of this town, you will find steep slopes flowing down into the Chicamocha Canyon and concluding in the Chicamocha River, at the base of the canyon.  In this area there are many hiking trails along with the Cueva de la Vaca, the cave considered the most beautiful in Santander with majestic formations and galleries that captivate its visitors with their exuberant beauty. The inhabitants grow the fique; a native plant, from which a fiber is used to create bags, belts, rugs, curtains, among many other products.

San Gil 

San Gil is the capital of the Guanentá province and regarded as the most popular destination in Colombia for adventure and extreme sports, with elements of water, land, and air, all linked to nature tourism. It has an abundance of natural spaces filled with waterfalls, rivers, caves, mountains and the great Chicamocha canyon.

Socorro 

The iconic town of Socorro is the location of the first steps towards independence, which was stretched into all the surrounding. Owing to the historic events that took place in Socorro, it was declared a Site of National Cultural Interest in 1963.

Mogotes 

For the Guane Indians, the definition of Mogotes is “Bathing in the stream that rises in the pit of the mountain”. It is surrounded by beautiful nature and a number of waterfalls with swimming holes are in close proximity. It was recognized as a garden town of Santander and the sweet land of Santander. It is a very traditional Colombian country town, the weekend markets are full of the local farmers who have come to sell and buy their products.

Other Towns 
 Coromoro
 Desert
 Encino
 Goatherd
 Jordán
 Ocamonte
 Onzaga
 Pinchote
 San Joaquin
 Valley of San Jose
 Villanueva
 Wooded hills

Hydrography 

 Rio Fonce it is born in the south of this province and it crosses it from the south to the north-west gathering to his rios steps such as: pienta, the mogoticos, la broken of deer and other so many that soon we will comment, passes through towns such as charalá, valley of san jose, ocamonte, happens through territories of wooded hills, gil the urban helmet of san, through near pinchote and ends to rio suarez. 
 Rio Pienta Fonce is one of the main tributaries of Rio Fonce
 Rio Taquiza Fonce: another one of the main tributaries of Rio Fonce
 Rio Mogoticos: this tributary of rio Fonce as its name indicates it comes from the guanentino wooded hill municipality and ends to rio Fonce in the heat of park the gil gallineral of san. 
 Broken of Deer: this gorge comes from the Guanentino municipality of Paramo and ends at Rio Fonce in Cercanias of the bridge of the valley (bridge that unites San Gil and paramo with the valley municipality of San Jose).

External links 
 Map of Province

Provinces of Santander Department